Styx is an unincorporated community in Kaufman County, located in the U.S. state of Texas.

References

Unincorporated communities in Kaufman County, Texas
Unincorporated communities in Texas